Ypthima sakra, the Himalayan five-ring, is a butterfly in the family Nymphalidae native to Asia.

Subspecies

The species may be divided into the following subspecies:

 Ypthima sakra sakra - Sikkim, Bhutan 
 Ypthima sakra austeni (Moore, 1893) - Assam, northern Burma, south-eastern Tibet (Yigong), Gooligonshan Mts. 
 Ypthima sakra nujiangensis Huang, 2001 - south-eastern Tibet
 Ypthima sakra leechi Forster, 1948 - Sichuan
 Ypthima sakra matinia Fruhstorfer, 1911 - north-western India

Description
The upperside of the forewings shows one ocellus, while hindwings have three ocelli. The underside is yellow, covered with short narrow dark brown striae (stripes). The underside of the forewings has one ocellus, while hindwings has two geminated (paired) anterior ocelli and three single posterior ocelli. Larva feeds on Gramineae.

Distribution and habitat
This species can be found in Bhutan, Burma, Tibet and north-western India. The habitat consists of wet grasslands and forest clearings and margins in submontane and montane areas.

References

External links
 Butterflies of India

sakra
Butterflies of Asia
Butterflies of Indochina
Fauna of Tibet
Insects of Bhutan
Insects of Myanmar
Butterflies described in 1857